The 2012 Open Prévadiès Saint–Brieuc was a professional tennis tournament played on clay courts. It was the ninth edition of the tournament which was part of the 2012 ATP Challenger Tour. It took place in Saint-Brieuc, France between 2 and 8 April 2012.

Singles main draw entrants

Seeds

 1 Rankings are as of March 19, 2012.

Other entrants
The following players received wildcards into the singles main draw:
  Charles-Antoine Brézac
  Josselin Ouanna
  Olivier Patience
  Laurent Rochette

The following players received entry from the qualifying draw:
  Tomasz Bednarek
  José Checa Calvo
  Victor Crivoi
  Nicolas Renavand

Champions

Singles

 Grégoire Burquier def.  Augustin Gensse, 7–5, 6–7(5–7), 7–6(7–3)

Doubles

 Laurynas Grigelis /  Rameez Junaid def.  Stéphane Robert /  Laurent Rochette, 1–6, 6–2, [10–6]

External links
Official Website
ITF Search
ATP official site

Open Prevadies Saint-Brieuc
Saint-Brieuc Challenger
April 2012 sports events in Europe
2012 in French tennis